The Ciucă Cabinet is the 132nd and current government of Romania led by former Romanian Land Forces army general Nicolae Ciucă (PNL; also current PNL president) since 25 November 2021 to the present day.

The grand coalition forming the government, consisting of Social Democratic Party (PSD), National Liberal Party (PNL), and Democratic Alliance of Hungarians in Romania (UDMR/RMDSZ), is also referred to as the National Coalition for Romania (CNR).

Background and formation 

On 1 September 2021, the PNL, then-Prime Minister Florin Cîțu and still incumbent President Klaus Iohannis triggered the 2021 Romanian political crisis by the sacking of former Justice Minister Stelian Ion, preceded by a scandal between the PNL and their former coalition partners, the progressive-liberal USR PLUS (from which Ion stemmed), on the so-called Anghel Saligny investment program (or "PNDL 3", as it is also known). The remaining USR ministers eventually resigned on their own, and the Cîțu Cabinet, which preceded the Ciucă Cabinet, was dismissed on 5 October through a motion of no confidence, with a record number of votes on behalf of USR, PSD, and AUR.

The prime minister candidate, who is designated by the president, has to request the investiture vote/vote of confidence from the legislature within 10 days from being appointed. On 11 October, President Iohannis designated Dacian Cioloș of the USR to form the next government, but his government was subsequently rejected by the parliament. Nicolae Ciucă of PNL was designated for the same position on 20 October, but eventually submitted his term. At that time, he was ordered by the PNL to convene negotiations only for a PNL-UDMR minority government, which is a form of government that was not accepted by a party other than PNL and UDMR.

The national-liberals resorted to negotiations with the largest party in the parliament, the Social Democratic Party (PSD) in the prospect of forming a majority government with full powers, but they quickly reached a deadlock. The PSD, who were the main opposition party against the cabinets formed around the PNL up to this point, wanted the office of Prime Minister, but the PNL refused to cede the office and strongly desired that the office be occupied by a PNL member, which happened with the re-designation of Nicolae Ciucă by President Iohannis on 22 November, one day after the negotiations ended.

The cabinet hearings took place on 24 November. The Ciucă Cabinet was sworn-in on 25 November.

Technological initiatives 
The cabinet has shown support for some technological projects like: nuclear energy by small modular nuclear reactors through a partnership with the US firm NuScale Power, electric vehicule development by a group of investors from Cluj and green energy projects. The cabinet also supports the Anghel Saligny investment program.

Composition 

The Ciucă Cabinet is a grand coalition government consisting of the Social Democratic Party (PSD), the National Liberal Party (PNL), the Democratic Alliance of Hungarians in Romania (UDMR/RMDSZ), and independent politicians. Some positions within the government are set to rotate between the PSD and the PNL, more specifically the prime minister, the secretary-general of the government, and the ministries of interior, justice, finance, and defense. Assuming the coalition will not disband in the meantime, the next shuffle will take place on 25 May 2023.

Party breakdown 

Party breakdown of current cabinet ministers:

References 

Government of Romania
2021 establishments in Romania
Cabinets established in 2021
2021 in Romania
Rotation governments
Current governments
Grand coalition governments
2022 in Romania